Leonie Kooiker (20 October 1927 – 16 April 2020) was a Dutch children's writer. She was born in Markelo, Netherlands. She published for the children's magazine Kris Kras. Her first book, won her the Gouden Griffel. Her book Het Oerlanderboek won her the Vlag en Wimpel award.

Kooiker died in Papendrecht, Netherlands on 16 April 2020, aged 92.

Bibliography 
1970 Het malle ding van bobbistiek (Gouden Griffel), Ploegsma
1972 De boevenvangers, Ploegsma
1972 De diamant van de piraat, Ploegsma
1972 Het laantje met de lindeboom, Lemniscaat
1973 De dochter van de schilder op de berg, Ploegsma
1974 De heksensteen (Ibby honour list USA), Ploegsma
1974 Je hart of je heerlijkheid (streekroman), Bigot en van Rossum
1976 Het levende beeld in de tempel, Ploegsma
1979 Het oerlanderboek, Ploegsma
1981 Tante Mien, Leopold
1982 Ga niet te ver, je valt eraf, Zwijsen
1982 Je mag een poosje los (6+), Zwijsen
1982 Dan liever de lucht in, Leopold
1982 Met de grote vogel mee, Terra
1983 De zwarte bende (zoeklicht), Zwijsen
1983 Je kunt het niet meenemen, Leopold
1983 Het woekerkoraal, Leopold
1984 De maanlandexpres, Leopold
1984 De kleine dief, Ploegsma
1985 Bang in bed (6+), Zwijsen
1986 Bommen in de grond, Leopold
1987 Ik zit hier te schrijven (met anderen), Leopold
1988 De temponauten, Leopold
1989 Roel en de rode kwalkop, Leopold
1989 Het stampen van de slang, Leopold
1990 Een sponsor voor de boys, Dijkstra
1990 Een boze meneer (6+), Zwijsen
1990 De kinderen van de Esborgh (vijf delen), Malmberg
1991 De wensballonnen, Zwijsen
1992 Een barre berentocht (prentenboek), La Rivière en Voorhoeve
1992 Het wrede vuur (zoeklicht), Zwijsen
1993 Wát zei het prinsesje? (6+), Zwijsen
1993 Een gulden voor grootvader zon (zoeklicht), Zwijsen
1994 Grimnir met de dorre hand (zoeklicht), Zwijsen
1994 De enge onderneming van meneer Ondertak, Ploegsma
1995 Pas op voor de buurvrouw (zoeklicht), Zwijsen
1995 Stiekem verhuizen (6+), Zwijsen
1995 Een bal van goud (prentenboek), Ploegsma
1995 Het tijgeroog, Ploegsma
1996 Het woekerkoraal (herzien), Ploegsma
1996 Een liefdesdrank voor Cindy (zoeklicht), Zwijsen
1997 De trollenval (4-6), Ploegsma
1997 Het neveneffect, Ploegsma
1997 De steen van de pentapoden, Ploegsma
1997 Het spookt op school (zoeklicht), Zwijsen
1997 Het huis op zolder, Zwijsen
1998 Bonzo past op het huis (6+), Zwijsen
1998 Zet je heksenhoed op en vlieg, Zwijsen
1999 De leedwezens, Ploegsma
2000 In de schuur van opa, Zwijsen
2000 De kraak, Ploegsma
2001 Lieve Marsman, Zwijsen
2001 De jungle van S. van Es, Zwijsen
2004 Opgesloten in school (7/8), Zwijsen
2005 Ouders kun je niet kiezen (leesleeuw), Zwijsen
2006 De grote boze wolf (groep 3), Zwijsen
2006 Een gevaarlijk geheim (leesleeuw), Zwijsen
2007 Kippenvriend, Zwijsen
2008 de Koppendans
2008 3 vrienden – DVD
2008 The Fairy Travelers
2009 3 vrienden – Boek
2010 7×7 Dieren (Kleur & Zwart/Wit) geïllustreerd
2010 De Koppendans, een jonge vrouw kiest voor Afrika
2010 De Zeeroverhoofdvrouw

References

1927 births
2020 deaths
Dutch children's writers
People from Overijssel
Dutch women children's writers
20th-century Dutch writers
20th-century Dutch women writers
21st-century Dutch writers
21st-century Dutch women writers